Baghdad Satellite Channel is a terrestrial television network in Iraq.

References

External links

Television stations in Iraq
Muslim Brotherhood
Arabic-language television stations